Belegali is a village in Dharwad district of Karnataka, India.

Demographics 
As of the 2011 Census of India there were 528 households in Belegali and a total population of 2,533 consisting of 1,302 males and 1,231 females. There were 311 children ages 0-6.

References

Villages in Dharwad district